Greenvale Airport (IATA: GVP, ICAO YGNV) is an airport in Greenvale, Queensland, Australia. The entrance to the airport is on the Gregory Highway, about 2 miles east of Greenvale.

References

Airports in Queensland